The Dr. C.A. Thigpen House is a historic mansion in Montgomery, Alabama, U.S.. It was built for Dr. Charles A. Thigpen, a physician, circa 1898. It was designed in the classical style by architect Frank Lockwood. It has been listed on the National Register of Historic Places since 13 December 1977.

References

Houses on the National Register of Historic Places in Alabama
Houses completed in 1898
Houses in Montgomery, Alabama